Ekrem Ibrić (born 25 January 1962, in Srebrenik) is a former Yugoslav football player, from the 1980s. Currently, he is Sloboda Tuzla's secretary.

Career
Ibrić played several seasons in the Yugoslav First League with Sloboda Tuzla.

References

External links 
 https://web.archive.org/web/20120429115916/http://www.sdsloboda.ba/fudbalski_klub.htm

1962 births
People from Srebrenik
Living people
Yugoslav footballers
FK Sloboda Tuzla players
Association football defenders